Marceli Żółtowski (14 March 1812 in Białcz, Kreis Kosten – 29 April 1901 in Poznań) was a Polish count and politician. A member of the Prussian House of Representatives, he had been a count since 1867 and held positions such as landlord of Greater Poland, general director of Towarzystwo Kredytowe Ziemskie of Grand Duchy of Posen (1850–1869) and was finally a member of the Prussian House of Lords from 1880 to his death in 1901.

References
 

1812 births
1901 deaths
Counts of Poland
People from Międzychód County
Polish politicians
Member of the Prussian National Assembly